, also known as Black & White, is a Japanese manga series written and illustrated by Taiyō Matsumoto, originally serialized from 1993 to 1994 in Shogakukan's seinen manga magazine Big Comic Spirits. The story takes place in the fictional city of Takaramachi (Treasure Town) and centers on a pair of orphaned street kids – the tough, canny, Black, and the childish, innocent, White, together known as the Cats – as they deal with yakuza attempting to take over Treasure Town.

A pilot film directed by Kōji Morimoto was released in January 1999. A feature-length anime film directed by Michael Arias and animated by Studio 4°C premiered in Japan in December 2006.

Plot
While the manga follows multiple plot threads, the film adaptation consists of most plots shown in the manga.

Black is a violent and streetwise punk, considering Takaramachi to be "his town". White is younger and appears to be mentally impaired, out of touch with the world around him and often living in a world of illusions. They call themselves "the Cats". Despite their extreme differences, they complement and support each other, similar to the Chinese Taoist principle of yin and yang.

During one of their "missions", they take on thugs and Black ends up beating up three Yakuza gang members who are menacing a street gangster friend of his. Snake plans to tear down and rebuild Takaramachi as a theme park to fit his own goals and dreams. When Black interferes once too often, Yakuza are sent to kill him, but fail. Angered, Snake then sends the deadly "three assassins" known as Dragon, Butterfly, and Tiger, near-superhuman hitmen, to finish the job.

In order to save Black and himself, White has to kill the first assassin Dragon by tipping gasoline and setting it alight, burning him alive. The second assassin Butterfly pursues White and stabs him with a samurai sword. White is then sent to the hospital. The police, who have been watching both Snake and the two youngsters, decide to take White into protective custody "for his own good", while Black watches White go knowing he would be too hard to look after while being hunted. Black later falls into a depressive state.

Eventually, Kimura is forced by Snake to kill his former boss and mentor, to remove possible competition. While Kimura fulfills his mission, he is deeply shocked by having murdered his mentor. Summoned once again by Snake, Kimura rebels and kills the Yakuza boss, before attempting to flee with his pregnant wife from Takaramachi. He is gunned down in a drive-by shooting by Snake's men.

While the police feel it is for the best for White to remain with them outside Takaramachi, White feels empty without Black there for support. In parallel, without White, Black soon begins to lose grip on reality and allows his violence to consume him. He soon develops a split personality, with his dark side manifesting as the "minotaur". Things reach a climax when White is brought back to Takaramachi by one of the officers and taken to a local fair. There, a delusional Black is trying to show people that "White", in reality a mocked-up doll, has returned to life. When Black is attacked by Snake's two remaining assassins, the doll is damaged and Black flies into a murderous rage, killing the assassins. It is then that he is confronted by the real White, and is forced to fight the "minotaur", who wishes to completely consume him. Black manages to triumph over his dark side and reunites with White, last seen playing in the beach.

Media

Manga
Tekkonkinkreet is written and illustrated by Taiyō Matsumoto. It was originally serialized from 1993 to 1994 in Shogakukan's Big Comic Spirits. Shogakukan compiled its chapters into three wide-ban volumes, released from February 7, 1994, to May 30, 1994. Shogakukan republished the series in a single volume on December 15, 2006.

In North America, the series was renamed Black & White, and start publishing in the first issue of Viz Media's Pulp in December 1997, along with Strain, Dance till Tomorrow and Banana Fish. The manga completed 2 thirds of its run in the magazine, and in September 1999, it was replaced by Bakune Young. Viz Media published the three volumes from March 8, 1999, to November 30, 2000. In 2007, Viz Media released the series into a single volume, with the title Tekkonkinkreet: Black & White, on September 25, 2007.

Volume list

Anime films

Pilot
A CG-animated pilot film was released in 1999. The film was directed by Kōji Morimoto and had character models designed by Naoko Sugita. Hiroaki Takeuchi was the producer, Lee Fulton was the animation supervisor, and the 2006 feature-length film's director, Michael Arias, served as CG director. The entire 4-minute short was completed with a staff of 12 people.

2006 film
All three manga issues were adapted into a 2006 feature-length anime film of the same name, directed by Michael Arias and animated by Studio 4°C. The film Tekkonkinkreet premiered in Japan on December 23, 2006. The city featured in Tekkonkinkreet was deemed as "the central character of the film" and the city's design was inspired by the cityscapes of Tokyo, Japan; Hong Kong; Shanghai, China; and Colombo, Sri Lanka to give a pan-Asian feel to the city. The English electronic music duo Plaid composed the music. Asian Kung-Fu Generation performed the theme song for the film "Aru Machi no Gunjō".

The film featured the following cast:

 * - Minor Role
 ** - Not credited on the DVD

Reception

Manga
Tekkonkinkreet has been generally well received by critics, for its story and particularly for Matsumoto's artwork and style. Jason Henderson of Mania.com, reviewed the third volume of the manga. He noted Matsumoto's influence by French comics and writing, and how he was able to create a "truly remarkable story that mixes Japanese sensibility with a European look and pace". Matthew J. Brady of Manga Life, gave the series an "A" grade. Brady praised the series for its unique and expressive artwork, stating that it is more like something seen in independent American or European comics than in standard manga, also comparing his style to Western artists Brandon Graham, Corey Lewis and Bryan Lee O'Malley. He also wrote that the relationship and character of the main protagonists is very believable, despite their superhuman acrobatic and fighting abilities. Brady concluded: "It's a rich book that you can pore over absorbing at all the content". Shaenon K. Garrity wrote: "Tekkon Kinkreet is one of the most visually stunning comics I know. Matsumoto can draw the hell out of anything, and the warped, kinetic, graffiti-influenced style he uses here is perfect for the loopy action-packed story". Garrity added that it also got a strong story, and the two central characters are "surprisingly lovable and touching", and that their "odd, clumsily affectionate, ultimately powerful relationship" is the core of the manga. Scott Campbell of activeAnime, said that the manga is "one of those books that everyone will get a slightly different feeling from, and a different idea of what the point of it all was". About the art style, he wrote that it does not fit anything exactly, and "it gives a feel of grunge, cyber-punk, and our confusion over the separation of ourselves from nature – or whether a cityscape could now be described as nature to humankind". Campbell concluded: "It’s masterful at what it does in both telling a compelling story and being so visually unique. A mature work worth giving a chance to entertain you". Sandra Scholes, of the same website, wrote that the art is "rough and rugged, much like the character's personalities", but that "there is room for fun in this huge epic novel of life in neo-punk Japan, its sprawling place, urban people and slightly dodgy nightlife", making it a "one off masterpiece". Joseph Luster of Otaku USA, felt that the brotherly bond between the protective Black and the endearing White was the heart of the manga. Regarding Matsumoto's artwork, he wrote that it could be "an acquired taste for some, but I also doubt anyone that gets into it will ever want to let it go". Luster concluded: "Tekkonkinkreet is a mighty achievement that should be inspirational to artists and just plain absorbing to anyone else." Deb Aoki of About.com, gave the series 4.5 out of 5 stars. Aoki was less enthusiastic about Matsumoto's artwork, and wrote that his dreamlike vision of a Japanese city "chaotically" defies the laws of perspective, and it is like "Las Vegas on acid". Nonetheless, she affirmed that the main appeal of the series is its story and "how it touches the heart"; "two orphans become symbols of a struggle between opposing opposites: innocence and corruption, hope and cynicism, imagination versus reality".

Kai-Ming Cha of Publishers Weekly, ranked Tekkon Kinkreet: Black and White first on the "Top 10 Manga for 2007".

Film
The film holds a 76% rating on review aggregator website Rotten Tomatoes based on 21 reviews, and an average score of 65 on Metacritic based on 9 critics.

Chris Beveridge, writing in Mania, declared: "While it may not be what anime fans have come to expect for a traditional film, the end result is something that while predictable is surprisingly engaging." Chris Johnston of Newtype USA wrote: "Regardless of how much you watch this one, though, this is a film that no serious anime fan should miss".

Awards

Manga
The manga won the 2008 Eisner Award for "Best U.S. Edition of International Material—Japan".

Film
Tekkonkinkreet won the "Best Film Award" at the 2006 Mainichi Film Awards. It was also named Barbara London's top film of 2006 in the annual "Best of" roundup by the New York Museum of Modern Art's Artforum magazine. In 2008, it received "Best Original Story" and "Best Art Direction" from the Tokyo International Anime Fair.
It won the 2008 Japan Academy Prize for Animation of the Year.

Notes

References

Further reading

External links

  Tekkonkinkreet official site
 Tekkonkinkreet official site  at Sony Pictures
 Tekkonkinkreet trailer
 Viz Media official site
 
 

 Interviews
 Taiyo Matsumoto’s "Tekkon Kinkreet" into anime
 Otaku USA interview with Michael Arias
 IONCINEMA.com interview with Michael Arias
 Daily Yomiuri/de-VICE interview with Michael Arias 
 Interview with Arias 

1993 manga
2006 anime films
Animated films about orphans
Animated films based on manga
Aniplex
Coming-of-age anime and manga
Eisner Award winners
Japan Academy Prize for Animation of the Year winners
Manga series
Seinen manga
Shogakukan manga
Studio 4°C
Urban fantasy anime and manga
Viz Media manga
Yakuza films